Hirne is a rural settlement in the Yalta Municipality of the Autonomous Republic of Crimea, a territory recognized by a majority of countries as part of Ukraine and annexed by Russia as the Republic of Crimea.

Previously, the settlement was known as the Eriklik village Following the forced deportation of the Crimean Tatars in 1944, the Presidium of the Supreme Soviet of the Russian SFSR published a decree on May 18, 1948 renaming the settlement along with many others throughout Crimea from their native Crimean Tatar names to their current variants.

Its population was 85 in the 2001 Ukrainian census. Current population:

References

Rural settlements in Crimea
Yalta Municipality